Cao Naiqian (born February 1949) is a Chinese novelist and essayist. He is a member of the China Writers Association. He is the director of Shanxi Writers Association and vice-president of Datong Writers Association.

Biography
Cao was born Cao Naitian in Ying County, Shanxi in February 1949, he has a childhood name Zhaoren. He attended Dashizi School and Datong No. 5 Meddle School. In 1965, the year before the Cultural Revolution, he was accepted to Datong No. 1 High School. After high school, his studies was interrupted by the Cultural Revolution, he forced to work in the fields instead of going to university. In 1968 he worked as a coal miner in the Jinhua Gongkuang, and one year later he was transferred to the Art Troupe of Datong Bureau of Mine Affairs. In October 1972, he was transferred again to the Bureau of Public Security as a criminal police. He started to publish works in 1986, at the age of 37. In 1991, he joined the China Writers Association. In 1995, one of his articles was included in the first issue of Reader's Digest.

Works

Novellas
 The Loneliness of Buddha

Novels
 There Is Nothing I Can Do When I Think of You Late at Night

Short stories
 The Last Village
 The Old Man

Proses and poems
 My Life Notes

References

1949 births
People from Shuozhou
Living people
People's Republic of China novelists
People's Republic of China essayists
Writers from Shanxi